David Somerville (6 August 1856 – 4 February 1933) was a Scotland international rugby union player He also played for the Scotland national cricket team.

Rugby Union career

Amateur career

His club was Edinburgh Institution F.P.

Provincial career

He played for Edinburgh District in their inter-city match against Glasgow District on 1 December 1877.

He played for Whites Trial in their match against Blues Trial on 16 February 1878. This trial match was to try and impress the Scotland international side selectors.

He played for East of Scotland District in their match against West of Scotland District on 1 March 1879.

International career

He was capped six times for Scotland between 1879-84 including the 1883 Home Nations Championship.

Cricket career

He played for the Scotland national cricket team.

References

Sources

 Bath, Richard (ed.) The Scotland Rugby Miscellany (Vision Sports Publishing Ltd, 2007 )

1856 births
1933 deaths
Scottish rugby union players
Scotland international rugby union players
Rugby union players from Leith
Edinburgh Institution F.P. players
East of Scotland District players
Edinburgh District (rugby union) players
Whites Trial players
Rugby union forwards